Henry Poole may refer to:

Henry Poole (died 1559), MP for Leicestershire
Henry Poole (died 1580), MP for Wootton Bassett in 1553
Henry Poole (died 1616) (1541–1616), of Sapperton. English MP for Gloucestershire
Henry Poole (died 1632) (1564–1632), of Kemble. English MP for Wiltshire
Henry Poole (died 1652) (c. 1592–c. 1652), English MP for Cirencester
Henry Poole (sculptor) (1873–1928), sculptor and member of the Royal Academy
Henry Poole (technologist), American internet specialist
Henry Ward Poole (1825–1890), American engineer and writer
Henry Poole & Co, English tailoring firm

See also
Henry Poole Is Here, 2008 film
Harry Poole (born 1935), English footballer
Harry Poole (rugby league), rugby league footballer of the 1960s for Great Britain, and Hull Kingston Rovers

Poole, Henry